The Fennia Prize is a Finnish design award. The purpose of the Fennia Prize is to present well-designed products and to encourage firms and companies to apply design in a comprehensive and interactive manner in product development, manufacturing and the corporate image. The prize has been awarded since 2003. The Fennia Prize is awarded as a part of the Fennia Prize – Good design grows global competition.

The prize is awarded every second year to a firm or company. In the competition, there are two series: Product Design Series and Open Series, including, for example, business and service concepts and environments. The prize-winning products are presented to the public at the Fennia Prize exhibition.

Design Forum Finland and the Fennia Group are the organizing bodies of the Fennia Prize - Good design grows global competition. The money for the prizes is donated by the Fennia Group. Design Forum is responsible for the realization of the competition and the related exhibition.

1990-2001 a similar competition was arranged under the title Pro Finnish Design.

Fennia Prize winners

Articles and news about Fennia Prize
"The Fennia Prize 2009 on Display in Seoul in December"

Design awards